Dorthe A. Wolfsberg (née Rasmussen; born 2 December 1958) is retired Danish sprinter. She represented her country at the 1983 World Championships and later married fellow retired runner Christian Wolfsberg.

International competitions

Personal bests

Outdoor
100 metres – 11.42 (+0.9 m/s, Helsinki 1983)
200 metres – 23.36 (+0.8 m/s, Potsdam 1983)
100 metres hurdles – 13.95 (+0.4 m/s, Prague 1978)
High jump – 1.86 (1981)
Long jump – 6.22 (Stockholm 1983)
Triple jump – 12.30 (1981)
Indoor
50 metres – 6.33 (Grenoble 1981)
60 metres – 7.45 (Milan 1982)
Long jump – 6.31 (Sindelfingen 1980)

References

1958 births
Living people
Danish female sprinters
Danish female hurdlers
Danish female long jumpers
World Athletics Championships athletes for Denmark